The Libertarian Society of Iceland was founded in Reykjavík, Iceland, on August 10, 2002. As the name suggests it is established on the ideals of libertarianism. It is currently the only active propertarian libertarian organization in Iceland.

The society aims at promoting the values of a free-market economy and individual liberty to the Icelandic public.

See also 

 Anarchism in Iceland
 Icelandic Commonwealth

External links
Frjálshyggjufélagið official site

2002 establishments in Iceland
Libertarian parties
Libertarianism in Europe